The following is a list of Nuestra Belleza México pageant editions and information.

Lists of events in Mexico
Mexico-related lists

Lists of beauty pageants editions